Country Again: Side A is the fifth studio album by American country music artist Thomas Rhett, and the first release of the Country Again double album project. It includes the singles "What's Your Country Song" and the project's title track. The album was released on April 30, 2021 through the Valory Music Co., and its follow-up Country Again: Side B was slated for release in 2023.

Background
Rhett co-wrote every song on the album. Most of the writing and work on the album was done during the COVID-19 pandemic, and Rhett called it the "best work I've ever done". He stated that he felt more inspiration from traditional country music in the process of making this album, noted musical influence from Eric Church, and remarked that he wanted to "tell a real, honest story from the heart". He said that with this album, he "was just trying to be a songwriter".

Track listing

Personnel
 Thomas Rhett – lead vocals, backing vocals (1-4, 9), whistle (7) 
 Charlie Judge – keyboards (1, 3-5, 9-11), Hammond B3 organ (2, 6-8, 10), acoustic piano (3), cello (5)
 Justin Niebank – programming 
 Jesse Frasure – programming (1-3, 5-8, 10, 11), acoustic guitar (3), synth bass (3)
 Luke Laird – programming (4)
 Josh Miller – programming (4)
 David Huff – programming (6)
 Matt Dragstrem – programming (9, 11), synth bass (9), backing vocals (9), acoustic guitar (11)
 Ilya Toshinsky – acoustic guitar (1, 2, 4-9), mandolin (2, 4, 9), gut string guitar (6), 12-string acoustic guitar (7), banjo (8-10), electric guitar (9), dobro (9), resonator guitar (9)
 Derek Wells – electric guitars (1, 5, 11)
 Dann Huff – electric guitars (2-4, 6-8, 10), electric guitar solo (2, 3), ganjo (3), slide guitar solo (6), synth bass (6, 7), programming (7, 8), acoustic guitar (10)
 Patrick Droney – electric guitars (9), electric guitar solo (9)
 Tyler Chiarelli – dobro (3)
 Stuart Duncan – fiddle (7, 8, 10), mandolin (7)
 Paul Franklin – steel guitar (1-3, 6-10)
 Jimmie Lee Sloas – bass guitar 
 Chris Kimmerer – drums, percussion (2, 9-11), programming (6)
 Kirk "Jelly Roll" Johnson – harmonica (11)
 Josh Reedy – backing vocals
 Hardy – lead and backing vocals (9)

Production
 Dann Huff – producer 
 Jesse Frasure – producer (1-3, 5-8, 10, 11)
 Matt Dragstrem – producer (9), additional recording (9)
 Joe Baldridge – recording 
 Kam Lucherthand – recording assistant (1, 3, 6-8)
 Josh Ditty – recording assistant (2, 4, 5, 9-11)
 Drew Bollman – additional recording (9)
 David Huff – digital editing (1-8, 10, 11)
 Chris Small – digital editing (1-8, 10, 11)
 Brian David Willis – digital editing (2)
 Sam Cooke – digital editing (9)
 Justin Niebank – mixing at Blackbird Studio (Nashville, Tennessee) and Hound's Ear Studio (Franklin, Tennessee)
 Adam Ayan – mastering at Gateway Mastering (Portland, Maine)
 Mike "Frog" Griffith – production coordinator 
 Doug Rich – copy coordinator 
 Janice Soled – copy coordinator 
 Sandi Spika Borchetta – art direction
 Justin Ford – art direction, graphic design 
 Thomas Rhett – art direction, additional photography 
 John Shearer – cover photography, additional photography 
 Grayson Gregory – additional photography 
 Ali Ryan – grooming 
 Amanda Valentine – stylist 
 G Major Management – management

Commercial performance
In the United States, Country Again: Side A debuted at No. 10 on Billboard 200 with 30,000 equivalent album units (14,000 in album sales), becoming his fifth top 10 entry on the chart.

Charts

Weekly charts

Year-end charts

Release history

References

2021 albums
Thomas Rhett albums
Big Machine Records albums
Albums produced by Dann Huff
Albums produced by Jesse Frasure